The 2019 Polish Super Cup was the 29th Polish Super Cup, an annual Polish football match played between the reigning winners of the Ekstraklasa and Polish Cup. 
It was held on 13 July 2019 between the 2018–19 Ekstraklasa champions Piast Gliwice and the 2018–19 Polish Cup winners Lechia Gdańsk at the home of the Ekstraklasa champions Piast, the Stadion Miejski in Gliwice. 
Piast played their first ever Super Cup match, while Lechia played their second ever and the first since 1983. This was the first Super Cup match since 2010 to not feature Legia Warsaw.

Lechia won 3–1 to secure their second Super Cup title.

Match

See also
2018–19 Ekstraklasa 
2018–19 Polish Cup

References

2019
2019–20 in Polish football
Sport in Gliwice
July 2019 sports events in Poland